The Royal Engineers Museum, Library and Archive is a military engineering museum and library in Gillingham, Kent. It tells the story of the Corps of Royal Engineers and British military engineering in general.

History

The 'Ravelin Building', which was designed by Major E.C.S. Moore, Royal Engineers and was completed in 1905 at a cost £40,000, was originally used as electrical engineers' school before becoming the home of the museum in 1987. It was classed as Grade II listed on 5 December 1996. Its collection received 'Designated' status in 1998 (it is recognised as having an outstanding collection of national and international significance). It is one of only three military or regimental museums in the country to hold this status.

Collections
The museum and library hold over 500,000 objects relating to the history of the Corps of Royal Engineers and the development of military engineering. It also has a collection of paintings and a large collection of medals including 25 Victoria Crosses. Other items include a German V-2 rocket used during the Second World War, the map used by the Duke of Wellington during the Battle of Waterloo, a finial from the Mahdi's tomb, weapons used by Lieutenant John Chard during the Anglo-Zulu War, a collection of bridge-laying tanks, a Brennan torpedo and a Harrier jump jet.

See also
 Waterbeach Military Heritage Museum

References

External links

Royal Engineers Museum Official Website
Medway Council page
 

Regimental museums in England
Museums in Medway
Gillingham, Kent
Royal Engineers
Military engineering
Military and war museums in England
Technology museums in the United Kingdom
Musical instrument museums